In the Name of the Father are the first words of the trinitarian formula. 

In the Name of the Father may also refer to:

 In the Name of the Father (film), a 1993 film directed by Jim Sheridan about the Guildford Four
 In the Name of the Father (2006 film), an Iranian film by Ebrahim Hatamikia
 In the Name of the Father (album), an album by Altar
 "In the Name of the Father", a single from the Black Grape album It's Great When You're Straight...Yeah
 In the Name of the Father (novel), a 1978 novel by Tony Ardizzone

See also
 In the Name of My Father – The Zepset
 Name of the Father, a psychoanalytic concept
 In the Name of the Führer, a 1977 Belgian documentary film